Edoardo Garrone may refer to:
  founder of Edoardo Raffinerie Garrone
 Edoardo Raffinerie Garrone, Italian oil company
 , descendant of Edoardo Guida Garrone